Tuzkol is a high-altitude salt lake in Raiymbek District, Almaty Region, Kazakhstan.

The nearest village is Karasaz,  to the WNW.

Geography
It lies in the intermontane basin of the Eltchin-Buyryuk and Karatau ranges, north of the Tien Shan. The lake is shallow and its water is bittern salty, with a concentration that can become very high in certain seasons owing to high evaporation.

The lakeshore is flat and marshy and the bottom of the lake is muddy. The surrounding fields are a local livestock grazing area following the melting of the snows.

Flora and fauna
In some stretches reeds grow along the lakeshore. Tuzkol is a  Important Bird Area for the breeding, migrating and wintering of a number of water bird species, including the ruddy shelduck and the common crane.

See also 
List of lakes of Kazakhstan

References

External links

 Tuzkol – the Saltiest Mountain Lake in Kazakhstan

Lakes of Kazakhstan
Almaty Region
Important Bird Areas of Kazakhstan